John Hudson (11 October 1860 – 21 November 1941) was an English footballer who played as a half back. Born in Sheffield, Hudson played for hometown clubs Sheffield, The Wednesday and Sheffield United; he also represented England at international level.

Career

Club career
Hudson played most of his club football in the Sheffield area, starting out with Heeley before joining Sheffield. As a semi-professional Hudson played for a number of different teams in this period, as allowed by FA rules.

He joined The Wednesday in 1880, making his debut that December. While at Wednesday, Hudson made 16 appearances in the FA Cup, before the advent of the Football League. During his time with Wednesday, Hudson was briefly club secretary and a committee man.  He left The Wednesday in 1885 after taking a benefit match and then spent a short time with Blackburn Olympic.

Hudson answered the advertisement from new club Sheffield United asking for players for their inaugural season and was one of the first individuals signed by the club. He played in the club's very first match in September 1889, a friendly against Nottingham Rangers and served as team captain during that first season, in which he was virtually ever present. The following year however he was plagued by injuries and made only six appearances, eventually retiring to take up a position of trainer at The Wednesday.

International career
He also earned one international cap for England in February 1883. In his solitary international appearance, he was appointed captain and led his country to a 7–0 victory over Ireland.

Personal life
In the 1881 census, Hudson was described as a "German Silver Caster", and was living with his mother at School Lane, Sheffield. Following his retirement from playing Hudson became the licensee of the Castle Inn in Sheffield, and married Annie Mellor in September 1888. Hudson was the father in law of Sheffield Wednesday footballer Jimmy Spoors.

References

External links

Profile at EnglandFC.com

1860 births
1941 deaths
Footballers from Sheffield
English footballers
England international footballers
Association football defenders
Heeley F.C. players
Park Grange F.C. players
Owlerton F.C. players
Sheffield F.C. players
Sheffield Wednesday F.C. players
Walkley F.C. players
Blackburn Olympic F.C. players
Sheffield United F.C. players
Midland Football League players